The 2019–20 Women's EHF Champions League group stage began on 4 October and concluded on 17 November 2019. A total of 16 teams were competing for 12 places in the main round of the 2019–20 Women's EHF Champions League.

Draw
The draw for the group stage was held on 27 June 2019.

Seedings
The seedings were announced on 24 June 2019.

Format
In each group, teams played against each other in a double round-robin format, with home and away matches. After completion of the group stage matches, the top three teams advanced to the main round. Teams were not able to face opponents from the same country in the group.

Tiebreakers
In the group stage, teams were ranked according to points (2 points for a win, 1 point for a draw, 0 points for a loss). After completion of the group stage, if two or more teams had score the same number of points, the ranking will be determined as follows:

Highest number of points in matches between the teams directly involved;
Superior goal difference in matches between the teams directly involved;
Highest number of goals scored in matches between the teams directly involved (or in the away match in case of a two-team tie);
Superior goal difference in all matches of the group;
Highest number of plus goals in all matches of the group;
If the ranking of one of these teams is determined, the above criteria are consecutively followed until the ranking of all teams is determined. If no ranking can be determined, a decision shall be obtained by EHF through drawing of lots.

Groups
The matchdays were 4–6 October, 11–13 October, 18–20 October, 1–3 November, 8–10 November, 15–17 November 2019.

Group A

Group B

Group C

Group D

References

External links
Official website

Group stage